The 2020 Coastal Carolina Chanticleers football team represented Coastal Carolina University during the 2020 NCAA Division I FBS football season. The Chanticleers were led by second-year head coach Jamey Chadwell and played their home games at Brooks Stadium. They competed as a member of the East Division of the Sun Belt Conference.

Schedule
Coastal Carolina had games against Duquesne, Eastern Michigan, and South Carolina, which were canceled due to the COVID-19 pandemic. These were partially replaced with games against Campbell and Liberty. On December 3, due to COVID-19 issues in the Liberty football program, the game against Liberty was canceled and replaced with BYU.

Schedule Source:

Game summaries

at Kansas

Campbell

Arkansas State

at Louisiana

Georgia Southern

at Georgia State

South Alabama

Appalachian State

at Texas State

BYU

Coastal's originally scheduled opponent for this week was Liberty, which was forced to cancel the game due to COVID-19 issues. BYU, which had been looking to add a game for this week, was booked as the Flames' replacement.

at Troy
Postponed from originally scheduled date of November 14.

vs. Liberty (Cure Bowl)

Rankings

Players drafted into the NFL

References

Coastal Carolina
Coastal Carolina Chanticleers football seasons
Sun Belt Conference football champion seasons
Coastal Carolina Chanticleers football